Central Business District is a metro station of Zhengzhou Metro Line 4 and Line 5. The station is located in the northern part of Zhengdong New Area CBD, near Zhengdong Wetland Park.

History  
The station was opened on 20 May 2019.

Station layout 
The station has three levels underground, The B1 level is for the concourse, the B2 level is for the Line 5 platforms and the B3 level is for the Line 4 platforms.

Exits 
The station currently has 4 exits.

References 

Stations of Zhengzhou Metro
Line 4, Zhengzhou Metro
Line 5, Zhengzhou Metro
Railway stations in China opened in 2019